Jordan Young is an American television producer and writer best known for BoJack Horseman, Drawn Together, Raising Hope, and Life in Pieces.

Early life and education 
Young was born and raised in Syosset, NY, where he attended Syosset High School. He attended School of Visual Arts in New York, NY, and left after receiving a job offer in animation on The Simpsons.

Career 
Young began his career in animation as a character layout artist on the animated sitcom The Simpsons from 2000 until 2004, in addition to the animated series The Oblongs in 2001. He began his writing career on the adult animated sitcom Drawn Together in 2004 after developing the series for Comedy Central along with Dave Jeser and Matt Silverstein. Young was responsible for the original character designs and for helping the development team bring a visual element to the pitch to help executives understand the show's concept. He later served as a consultant on the 2010 film The Drawn Together Movie: The Movie! which followed the series finale. In 2008, he wrote an episode for the popular sitcom It's Always Sunny in Philadelphia. The following year, he produced an episode of the MTV animated series DJ & the Fro and wrote multiple episodes of the satirical sitcom series Better Off Ted.

He wrote and produced the popular sitcom Raising Hope from 2010 to 2014, followed by multiple episodes for the animated series Golan the Insatiable in 2015 and Son of Zorn in 2016 and 2017.

In 2015, Young co-wrote and co-executive produced the hit adult animated black comedy-drama series BoJack Horseman in collaboration with Elijah Aron. The series follows BoJack Horseman, who is described as "the most beloved sitcom horse of the '90s, 20 years later. He's a curmudgeon with a heart of... not quite gold... but something like gold. Copper?" It stars Will Arnett, Aaron Paul, and Amy Sedaris. Young is cited as saying of BoJack Horseman, "If he could talk, he would have pawned that burden off as quickly as possible." The show's writing has received rave reviews from multiple media outlets, including The Ringer who said: "The really striking thing is the way writers Jordan Young and Elijah Aron fold a one-off adventure into the broader themes of the show."

In 2017, Young and Aron were nominated for a Writers Guild of America Award for Television: Animation for the BoJack Horseman episode "Fish Out of Water". The episode received rave reviews from multiple critics, including The A.V. Club, who called it "a tour de force episode", "nothing short of a masterpiece", and "a bold, tremendous, and beautiful achievement in both animation and storytelling" and Paste Magazine, who said, "...in its playful, ingenious, sensitive portrait of a stranger in a strange land, 'Fish Out of Water' is likely to leave you as it left me: speechless," The show's creator, Raphael Bob-Waksberg, also praised Young and Aron for the episode, saying: "They took this thing that none of us knew how to write, and did a really good job writing a full script without the dialogue, describing everything meticulously: 'BoJack walks from the doorway to his bed. He sits down. Looks at his cigarette. How's he gonna light that?" The episode also won an Award in Annecy for Special Distinction for a TV Series that same year.

In June 2017, Young spoke on the Film2Future Panel, a nonprofit organization serving high schoolers in Los Angeles.

He has written and co-executive produced the CBS sitcom Life in Pieces since 2017.

Filmography

Film

Television

Awards and nominations 

|-
| 2017
| BoJack Horseman (Episode: "Fish Out of Water")
| Writers Guild of America Award for Television: Animation
| 
|-
|}

References

External links 

 Jordan Young on IMDb

Year of birth missing (living people)
Living people
Television producers from New York (state)
American television writers
Syosset High School alumni
People from Syosset, New York
Screenwriters from New York (state)